Iain Marsh (born 6 October 1980) is a former rugby league footballer who played in the 1990s and 2000s.

Background
Iain Marsh was born in Blackbrook, St Helens, Merseyside, England.

International honours
Iain Marsh won 5 caps for Scotland in 2004–2007 while at Oldham R.L.F.C., Batley Bulldogs, and Rochdale Hornets + 3-caps (sub).

Genealogical information
Iain Marsh is the son of the rugby league footballer who played in the 1970s for Oldham, and Rochdale Hornets; Derek Marsh.

References

External links
Profile at saints.org.uk
Marsh double lifts Barrow
Oldham 24-4 Sharlston
Morrison drops out of Scots squad
World Cup withdrawals for Scots

1980 births
Living people
Barrow Raiders players
Batley Bulldogs players
English people of Scottish descent
English rugby league players
Oldham R.L.F.C. players
Rochdale Hornets players
Rugby league centres
Rugby league players from St Helens, Merseyside
Rugby league second-rows
Rugby league wingers
Salford Red Devils players
Scotland national rugby league team players
St Helens R.F.C. players
Workington Town players